"Thanksgiving" is the tenth episode of the first season of the American television police sitcom series Brooklyn Nine-Nine. It was written by co-executive producer Luke Del Tredici and directed by Jorma Taccone, airing on Fox in the United States on November 26, 2013.

In this episode, Amy prepares a Thanksgiving dinner for the precinct in an attempt to ask Holt to be her mentor, much to Jake's dismay, as he hates the holiday. However, he and Holt leave the dinner in order to investigate a robbery in the evidence locker. Meanwhile, Santiago's dinner turns into a disaster. The episode was seen by an estimated 3.69 million household viewers and gained a 1.5/4 ratings share among adults aged 18–49, according to Nielsen Media Research. The episode received mostly positive reviews from critics, who praised Samberg's, Braugher's and Crews's performances.

Plot
It's Thanksgiving, and Amy Santiago (Melissa Fumero) prepares dinner for the precinct at her apartment in an attempt to get Raymond Holt (Andre Braugher) to be her mentor. This angers Jake Peralta (Andy Samberg), who hates the holiday. Peralta tries to get Holt to assign more cases to avoid the dinner and is told that if any case resurfaces, he can leave the dinner.

Before the dinner starts, Holt is notified that someone has stolen money from the evidence locker, much to Peralta's joy, and both of them leave to investigate. They find the man who robbed it due to his unique technique. He reveals that he stole it for a crime organization that operates at a Chinese casino. Peralta and Holt enter the casino and manage to arrest the gang. Peralta then admits to Holt that he hates Thanksgiving because of both of his parents' absence during the holiday. Holt assures him that he needs to join the precinct, his "new family."

Meanwhile, the dinner ends up messy because Santiago's food is badly received, which angers Terry Jeffords (Terry Crews), as he needs a certain number of calories to maintain his muscle mass. Amy also discovers that everyone dumped her food in the toilet and they leave for a bar. However, Amy tries to be reckless and ends up destroying a shelf, leading to them getting kicked out. Back at the precinct, she is told by Holt that he has read her planned speech and he assures her that it's great. In the end, the group winds back up at the precinct and has Thanksgiving dinner. It includes multi-ethnic foods provided by Boyle.

Reception

Viewers
In its original American broadcast, "Thanksgiving" was seen by an estimated 3.69 million household viewers and gained a 1.5/4 ratings share among adults aged 18–49, according to Nielsen Media Research. This was a 9% increase in viewership from the previous episode, which was watched by 3.36 million viewers with a 1.5/4 in the 18-49 demographics. This means that 1.5 percent of all households with televisions watched the episode, while 4 percent of all households watching television at that time watched it. With these ratings, Brooklyn Nine-Nine was the second most watched show on FOX for the night, beating Dads and The Mindy Project but behind New Girl, fourth on its timeslot and tenth for the night in the 18-49 demographics, behind New Girl, The Biggest Loser, Chicago Fire, Person of Interest, NCIS: Los Angeles, Dancing with the Stars, Agents of S.H.I.E.L.D., The Voice, and Rudolph the Red-Nosed Reindeer.

Critical reviews
"Thanksgiving" received mostly positive reviews from critics. Roth Cornet of IGN gave the episode a "great" 8.0 out of 10 and wrote, "Holiday episodes can be tricky, and Brooklyn Nine-Nine has now successfully tackled both Halloween and Thanksgiving. If there's one thing that the freshman comedy loves to do, it's teach Peralta that he's stronger as a part of the team. This episode serves as a great reminder for both that character and the viewer that as appealing as the individual players are, this group really shines when its working as a unit."

Molly Eichel of The A.V. Club gave the episode an "B+" grade and wrote, "Do real people hate holidays as much sitcom characters hate holidays? Thanksgiving episodes are a way to unite the cast in celebration, without the messiness and propriety of religion weighing the proceedings down — and then besiege them with disaster. So it's an interesting choice to separate out Peralta and Holt to their own storyline when the rest of the precinct gets to stay together as one unit. The structure functions to keep Peralta at the center of his own plot, allowing him to learn a lesson and reunite with the others at the end. It's a tricky prospect for a show like Brooklyn Nine-Nine, where the ensemble is so much more fun to watch than its main character. But the pairing of Peralta and Holt saves the episode from two dueling storylines, where the ensemble could overshadow the main talent."

Alan Sepinwall of HitFix wrote, "For most of this first season, I've been talking about episodes where one element didn't work, but others compensated for it, or where things didn't maybe work as a whole but individual pieces were funny enough to carry it all. 'Thanksgiving' was the first episode of the show where I didn’t have any 'Yes, but...' reactions – perhaps because I was just too busy laughing frequently in each scene. The series still has room to grow, but this was a really satisfying, really amusing early installment, easily my favorite one to date." Aaron Channon of Paste gave the episode an 8.5 out of 10 and wrote, "What results is a Thanksgiving special fully in the style and personality that Brooklyn Nine-Nine has established—loud, awkward, a little gross but very funny — while using just enough schmaltz to build the audience's love for the characters even more. Holt breaks out of his shell, Peralta learns the true meaning of Thanksgiving, Santiago receives approval from Holt, and Boyle further impresses Diaz. And, best of all, we get a great show."

References

External links

2013 American television episodes
Brooklyn Nine-Nine (season 1) episodes
Thanksgiving television episodes